A plurality vote (in American English) or relative majority (in the United Kingdom and Commonwealth) describes the circumstance when a party, candidate, or proposition polls more votes than any other but does not receive more than half of all votes cast.

For example, if from 100 votes that were cast,  45 were for Candidate A, 30 were for Candidate B and 25 were for Candidate C, then Candidate A received a plurality of votes but not a majority. In some votes, the winning candidate or proposition may have only a plurality, depending on the rules of the organization holding the vote.

Versus majority 
In international institutional law, a "simple majority" (also a "majority") vote is more than half of the votes cast (disregarding abstentions) among alternatives; a "qualified majority" (also a "supermajority") is a number of votes above a specified percentage (e.g. two-thirds); a "relative majority" (also a "plurality") is the number of votes obtained that is greater than any other option; and an "absolute majority" is a number of votes "greater than the number of votes that possibly can be obtained at the same time for any other solution", when voting for multiple alternatives at a time.

Henry Watson Fowler suggested that the American terms "plurality" and "majority" offer single-word alternatives for the corresponding two-word terms in British English, "relative majority" and "absolute majority", and that in British English "majority" is sometimes understood to mean "receiving the most votes" and can therefore be confused with "plurality". William Poundstone observes that systems which allow choosing by a plurality of votes are more vulnerable to the spoiler effect—where two or more similar choices each draw fewer votes than a dissimilar choice that would have lost to any individual similar choice on its own—than systems which require a majority.

See also 
Plurality voting system
Plurality-at-large voting
Plurality opinion
Voting system

Notes

References 

Majority
Voting theory